The Breeders' Cup Turf Sprint is a Weight for Age stakes race for thoroughbred racehorses three years old and up. As its name implies, it is a part of the Breeders' Cup World Championships, the de facto year-end championship for North American thoroughbred racing. The distance of the race will vary depending on the host track's turf course requirements.

The race was run for the first time in 2008 during the second day of Breeders' Cup racing at that year's host track, Santa Anita Park. The 2008 race was held at a distance of six and a half furlongs and was contested on Santa Anita's signature El Camino Real "downhill" turf course. Besides Santa Anita, the only tracks in North America capable of contesting turf sprints at six and a half furlongs are Woodbine and Belmont.  Churchill Downs, which has hosted the Breeders' Cup eight times, can only conduct turf sprints at 5 furlongs.  The 2015 race at Keeneland was held at approximately  furlongs.

Because of technical requirements, it was not eligible for classification as a graded stakes race in its first two runnings. Starting in 2010, it was a Grade II race, and was upgraded to Grade I for 2012.

Automatic Berths 
Beginning in 2007, the Breeders' Cup developed the Breeders' Cup Challenge, a series of races in each division that allotted automatic qualifying bids to winners of defined races. Each of the fourteen divisions has multiple qualifying races. Note though that one horse may win multiple challenge races, while other challenge winners will not be entered in the Breeders' Cup for a variety of reasons such as injury or travel considerations.

In the Turf Sprint division, runners are limited to 12 or 14 (depending on the dimensions of the host track and there are up to seven automatic berths. The 2022 "Win and You're In" races were:
 the Jaipur Invitational, a Grade I race run in June at Belmont Park in New York
 the King's Stand Stakes, a Group 1 race run in June at Royal Ascot in England
 the Nunthorpe Stakes, a Group 1 race run in August at York Racecourse in England
 the Green Flash Handicap, a stakes race run in September at Del Mar in California
 the Kentucky Downs Turf Sprint Stakes, a Grade III race run in September at Kentucky Downs in Kentucky
 the Flying Five Stakes, a Group 1 race run in September at Curragh Racecourse in Ireland
 the Prix de l'Abbaye de Longchamp, a Group 1 race run in October at Longchamp in France

Records 

Most wins:
 2 – Mizdirection (2012, 2013)
 2 – Stormy Liberal (2017, 2018)

Most wins by a jockey:
 2 – Mike Smith (2012, 2013)
 2 – Joel Rosario (2014, 2017)

Most wins by a trainer:
 3 – Peter Miller (2017, 2018, 2019)
 2 – Mike Puype (2012, 2013)

Most wins by an owner:
 2 – Jungle Racing/KMN Racing et al. (2012, 2013)
 2 – Rockingham Ranch (2017, 2018)

Winners

See also 

Breeders' Cup Turf Sprint "top three finishers" and starters
 Breeders' Cup World Thoroughbred Championships
 American thoroughbred racing top attended events

References 

Racing Post:

Turf races in the United States
Open sprint category horse races
Graded stakes races in the United States
Horse races in California
Turf Sprint
Recurring sporting events established in 2008
2008 establishments in California